This is a list of villages in Bulgaria by province.

List of villages in Blagoevgrad Province
List of villages in Burgas Province
List of villages in Dobrich Province
List of villages in Gabrovo Province
List of villages in Haskovo Province
List of villages in Kardzhali Province
List of villages in Kyustendil Province
List of villages in Lovech Province
List of villages and towns in Montana Province
List of villages in Pazardzhik Province
List of villages in Pernik Province
List of villages in Pleven Province
List of villages in Plovdiv Province
List of villages in Razgrad Province
List of villages in Rousse Province
List of villages in Shumen Province
List of villages in Silistra Province
List of villages in Sliven Province
List of villages in Smolyan Province
List of villages in Sofia City
List of villages in Sofia Province
List of villages in Stara Zagora Province
List of villages in Targovishte Province
List of villages in Varna Province
List of villages in Veliko Tarnovo Province
List of villages in Vidin Province
List of villages in Vratsa Province
List of villages in Yambol Province

See also

 List of villages in Europe
 Bulgaria
 Provinces of Bulgaria
 List of cities and towns in Bulgaria
 Municipalities of Bulgaria